Cirkus is an arena in Djurgården, Stockholm, that holds 1,650 people. It was originally used as a circus (the old official name being Cirkusteatern), but is today mostly used for concerts and musical shows.

The French circusman Didier Gautier became a Swedish citizen in 1830, and was granted permission to build a permanent circus building on Djurgården in Stockholm. In 1869 Didi Gautier sold his circus Didier Gautiers menagerie to Adèle Houcke. The building took fire later, and was rebuilt in 1892 as present Djurgårdscircus.

External links
Cirkus.se (official site)

References

Concert halls in Sweden
Indoor arenas in Sweden
Theatres in Stockholm
Music venues completed in 1892
1892 establishments in Sweden
Listed buildings in Stockholm